Nettenchelys dionisi is an eel in the family Nettastomatidae (duckbill/witch eels). It was described by Alberto Brito in 1989. It is a marine, deep water-dwelling eel which is known from the Canary Islands, in the eastern central Atlantic Ocean.

The species epithet, "dionisi" refers to Gustavo Perez-Dionis, and was given as a tribute for his contributions to the study of marine life in the Canary Islands.

References

Nettastomatidae
Fish described in 1989
Taxa named by Alberto Brito